The list of Interstate Highways in Pennsylvania encompasses 23 Interstate Highways—12 primary routes and 11 auxiliary routes—which exist entirely or partially in the U.S. state of Pennsylvania. In Pennsylvania, most of the Interstate Highways are maintained by the Pennsylvania Department of Transportation (PennDOT). Some stretches are also maintained by the Pennsylvania Turnpike Commission, Delaware River Port Authority, the Delaware River Joint Toll Bridge Commission, and two short stretches maintained by the New York State Department of Transportation (these being the Delaware River bridge on Interstate 84 (I-84) and a short stretch of the future I-86 in Bradford County). Interstate Highways make up three percent of all roadway lane miles in Pennsylvania and have a combined length of  within the state. Twenty-four percent of all vehicle traffic is on the Interstate System.


Primary Interstate Highways

Auxiliary Interstate Highways

Business routes

Gallery

See also

References

External links

Lists of roads in Pennsylvania
Interstate Highways in Pennsylvania